Beaching or Beached may refer to:

Common uses
Beaching (nautical), when a ship is deliberately or inadvertently "run aground"
Cetacean stranding, when a large sea mammal is beached on land

Arts, entertainment, and media
Beached Festival, a free annual music festival held on the south bay in Scarborough, England
"Beachin'", a song by Jake Owen

See also
Beeching Axe 
Richard Beeching, British engineer known for the Beeching Axe railway closures